René Victor Marie Barthes (1894–1965) is a colonial administrator, governor general of French West Africa.

Biography 
Born on October 8, 1894, in Carpentras, he was first professor of philosophy, then director of staff at the Ministry of the colonies in 1937.

From August 7, 1939, to September 20, 1939, he was governor of New Caledonia.
He was appointed Governor General of French West Africa in May 1946.

His chief of staff was Alioune Diop, who is founding the Pan-African magazine Présence africaine1. Barthès held his post until 27 January 1948, when he retired.

in the 1950s, along with Lucie Aubrac, he was a member of the governing body of  Human Rights League (France), which developed in the context of resistance to the Algerian war.

René Barthes died in 1965. His funeral was held in the Cathedral Saint-Louis of Versailles.

Writings 
 « L'exploitation du sous-sol africain devant l’Europe », La Nouvelle Revue française d'Outre-mer, XIV, no 3, Paris, mars 1953, p. 63-65.

References

Governors of French West Africa
1894 births
1965 deaths